Pumpkin Center may be:
Pumpkin Center, Orange County, Indiana
Pumpkin Center, Washington County, Indiana